Besalampy is a rural municipality on the west coast of Madagascar. It belongs to the district of Besalampy, which is a part of Melaky Region. The population of the municipality was 11331 in 2018.

Besalampy is served by a local Besalampy Airport and maritime harbour. In addition to primary schooling the town offers secondary education at both junior and senior levels. The town has a permanent court and hospital.

The majority 65% of the population of the municipality are farmers, while an additional 30% receives their livelihood from raising livestock. Most important export product is raffia palms. Other important crops are bananas, seeds of catechu and oranges.  Additionally fishing employs 5% of the population.
There is also a prawn farm in Besalampy.

History
In 2008 the municipality was destroyed by 95% by the Cyclone Fame

River
The Maningoza river has its mouth near Besalampy.

See also 
 Bemarivo Reserve at 12 km from Besalampy.
 the Maningoza Reserve is located in the district of Besalampy.
 Melaky

References 

Populated places in Melaky